Gbefi is a village in Kpando Municipal district, a district in the Volta Region of Ghana.

See also
Kpando Municipal District

References

External links and sources

External links
 Kpando Municipal District on GhanaDistricts.com

Populated places in the Volta Region